The HIGHLAND of Iceland is an uninhabited area that covers most of the center. the interior or backland of Iceland. It is often mistakenly called Highlands like the Scottish Highlands. The HIGHLAND  is situated above 300–400 meters (1000–1300 feet) and is mostly uninhabitable. The soil is mostly volcanic ash and basalt mountains and lava fields. It is also covered with snow from October until the beginning of June. This results largely in a surface of grey, black or brown earth, lava, and volcanic ashes. A few oasis-like areas, such as Herðubreiðarlindir and Þórsmörk, are found in the Highland. The highland has many natural wonders and interesting hiking trails.

Natural wonders in the Highland 
Some of the most interesting parts of Iceland is found in the Highland, such as Landmannalaugar, Torfajökull, Eldgjá, Þórsmörk, Herðubreið, Askja, Hveradalir, Lakagígar, Fagrifoss waterfall and many other beautiful places. Although highly interesting most of the places are difficult to visit and only in summer. Most of the places in the highland require a good 4X4 vehicle because the roads are dirt roads and F-roads. It is recommended to plan your carefully if you plan to travel in the Highland. Traveling in the Highland is always different, an adventure and highly interesting. It is the home of some of the most interesting places and natural wonders in Iceland.

Glaciers in the Highland 
Most of the glaciers in Iceland, such as Vatnajökull, Langjökull, Eyjafjallajökull, Mýrdalsjökull and Hofsjökull, are also part of the Icelandic Highland. All of the glaciers also have outlet glaciers with seperater names, like Breiðamerkurjökull or Tungnafellsjökull. Many glaciers sit on the top of a volcano and some of them erupt regularly, like the Bárðabunga volcano and glacier. The most famous one in our times is Eyjafjallajökull volacano and glacier that erupted in 2010. In the sandy Highland vegetation is only found on the edges of the glacier and by the many rivers, creeks that float through the HIGHLAND. There is also the danger of glacial outburst floods, or "glacier runs" at times of eruptions and volcanic activity.

Hiking in the Highland
There are several hiking trails in the Highland in Iceland. One of the most famous one is the 54 kilometers Laugavegur hiking trail from Landmannalaugar to Þórsmörk.  It takes four to five days and takes you through the most interesting and beautiful landscapes in Iceland. Other interesting hikes are Fimmvörðuháls and old Kjalvegur as well as many other hiking trails.  Some even cross glaciers and rivers.  The same applies to hiking as driving in the highland, if you are interested you should contact a local travel company that specialises in Highland tours for your safety.

Highland roads or F-Roads
The Highland can be crossed only during the Icelandic summer. For the rest of the year the highland roads are closed. The best known highland roads are Kaldidalur, Kjölur, Kjalvegur road, Fjallabak syðri, Fjallabak nyrðri, Lakavegur, Kverkfjöll, and Sprengisandur. Most highland roads require four-wheel drive vehicles, because it is necessary to cross rivers. However, the Kjölur route can easily be traversed in an ordinary car and is therefore one of the more popular highland roads. Off-road driving is forbidden entirely in Iceland where there is no snow, including the Highland, to protect the environment.

See also 
 Volcanism of Iceland
 Vatnajökull National Park
 Information about the Highland in Iceland

References

 Hálendið í Náttúru Íslands (The Highland in Iceland)

External links